The Warrior Class is a 2007 film directed by Alan Hruska and starring Anson Mount and Erica Leerhsen. Even though it was finished in 2004, it was not released on DVD until February 6, 2007.

Plot
Rookie lawyer Alec Brno (Mount) has just been assigned the case of his career: exposing a billion-dollar oil scam led by a ruthless mafia boss (Weber). When he reluctantly falls for the gangster's beautiful, but drug-addicted wife (Leerhsen), who is also his key witness, Alec soon realizes that all the legal savvy in the world can not protect him from the dangerous reality of mob violence. In a system where criminals often walk free, sometimes courtroom warriors must take the battle for justice into their own hands.

Cast
Anson Mount... Alec Brno
Erica Leerhsen... Annie Sullivan
Robert Vaughn... Braddock
Jake Weber... Phil Anwat
Jamey Sheridan... Macalister
Dan Hedaya... Rand
Tracie Thoms... Thelma

External links
 

2007 films
2007 drama films
American drama films
2000s English-language films
2000s American films